Leroy Scott (July 21, 1875 – May 11, 1929) was an American writer of novels and screenplays.

Biography
Scott was born in Fairmount, Indiana 11 May 1875. His father was a minister with the Religious Society of Friends. He graduated from Indiana University in 1897. His writing career began with three years experience as a reporter; he worked at a Louisiana newspaper owned by his brother. Later (1900–01) he became assistant editor of the Woman’s Home Companion.

Scott was a social activist. In 1902–3 he was assistant headworker at the University Settlement House. It is there that he met and later married on 27 Jun 1904 Miriam Finn, a Russian Jewish writer, with whom he had a daughter. Around this time Scott was an officer of the Intercollegiate Socialist Society, of which he was a founder. Scott had come to University Settlement after Hull House experience. After his settlement experience, Scott and his wife came to live at the "A-Club", a cooperative, and a "radical center."

In 1906, Scott helped arrange accommodations for Maxim Gorky during his visit to the United States. In 1907 Scott and his wife visited Russia.

To research his book about labor relations, The Walking Delegate (1905), Scott Joined the Structural Iron Workers Union.

In addition to novels, Scott became involved in the movie industry, where he accumulated numerous writing credits, as well as an acting credit in one film. When Goldwyn Pictures determined a need to produce movies in New York as well as on the west coast, Scott's Partners of the Night was chosen as the first work.

Scott drowned in Lake Chateaugay, near Plattsburgh, New York on 21 July 1929.

Works 
Children of the Whirlwind
The Walking Delegate (1905)
To Him that Hath (1907)
The Shears of Destiny (1910)
Vocations, ed. William DeWitt Hyde. Hall and Locke Company. Boston. Vol. 1. The Mechanic Arts. Richard C. Maclauren ed. (1911).  “Selden’s Explosion Buggy”. p. 343
Counsel for the Defense (1912)
No. 13 Washington Square (1914)
Graft (1915)
Partners of the Night (1916)
The Sturdy Oak; a composite novel of American politics by fourteen American authors (ch xiv) (1917)
Mary Regan (1918)
A Daughter of Two Worlds: A Novel of New York Life (1919)
Cordelia the Magnificent (1923)
The Heart of Katie O”Doone (1925)
Folly’s Gold (1926)
The Trail of Glory (1926)
The Living Dead Man (1929)

References

External links 

 
 

LeRoy Scott Papers. General Collection, Beinecke Rare Book and Manuscript Library, Yale University.

1875 births
1929 deaths
20th-century American novelists
American male novelists
American male screenwriters
Indiana University alumni
Novelists from Indiana
20th-century American male writers
Screenwriters from Indiana
Deaths by drowning in the United States
Accidental deaths in New York (state)
People from Grant County, Indiana
20th-century American screenwriters